Paint Your Picture may refer to:

"Paint Your Picture", a song from the 1993 Steve Hackett album Guitar Noir
"Paint Your Picture", a song from the 1999 Josh Ritter album Josh Ritter
"Paint Your Picture", a song from the 2009 Steve Cradock album The Kundalini Target